State Route 358 (SR 358) is a state highway in Sullivan County in the Tri-Cites region of East Tennessee.

Route description
SR 358 begins at SR 44 east of Bluff City. It then heads north and crosses the Holston River and continues north and then turns northeastward after it passes Sullivan East High School it then turns eastward then back north and enters Bristol City limits to junction with SR 394. It then continues a northerly track and ends at US 11E/US 19/SR 34 in Bristol.

Junction list

References

Transportation in Sullivan County, Tennessee
358